Jack Drumier (1867–1929) was an American film actor of the silent era.

Selected filmography
 The $5,000,000 Counterfeiting Plot (1914)
 The Beloved Adventuress (1917)
 The Volunteer (1917)
 Easy Money (1917)
 The Divorce Game (1917)
 The Marriage Market (1917)
 The False Friend (1917)
 The Little Duchess (1917)
 Darkest Russia (1917)
 Adventures of Carol (1917)
 The Beloved Blackmailer (1918)
 The Road to France (1918)
 By Hook or Crook (1918)
 Stolen Hours (1918)
 The Golden Wall (1918)
 Phil for Short (1919)
 The Black Circle (1919)
 Three Green Eyes (1919)
 Courage for Two (1919)
 You Find It Everywhere (1921)
 The Girl from Porcupine (1921)
 The Splendid Lie (1922)
 The Broken Silence (1922)
 Shadows of the Sea (1922)
 Enemies of Youth (1925)
 The Pinch Hitter (1925)

References

Bibliography 
 Cari Beauchamp. Without Lying Down: Frances Marion and the Powerful Women of Early Hollywood. University of California Press, 1998.
Ken Wlaschin. Silent Mystery and Detective Movies: A Comprehensive Filmography. McFarland, 2009.

External links 
 

1867 births
1929 deaths
American male film actors
People from Philadelphia